Ballerina is a 2006 documentary film that follows the training sessions, rehearsals, and everyday lives of five Russian ballerinas at different stages in their career. The film features footage of classes at the Vaganova Ballet Academy as well as performances in the Mariinsky Theatre.

References

External links
 

2006 television films
2006 films
Documentary films about ballet
First Run Features films